HMS Larke (or Lark) was contracted to be built by Sir Anthony Deane of Blackwall, knighted after he left Portsmouth Dockyard in 1673. She had the lines of Greyhound and was a standard 18-gun vessel. She was commissioned in June 1675 for trade protection, she patrolled the North Sea and Channel with her final service with the Fleet. She took a number of privateers during her service. She was sold on 3 May 1698.

Larke was the third named vessel when it was used for a pinnace in service in 1588.

Design and specifications
Her construction dates little is known other than her order date and launch date. The ship was ordered on 30 September 1674. She was launched at Blackwall on 11 June 1675. Her draught was only . Her tonnage was calculated as 199 25/94 tons. Her construction cost £2,481.8.0d.

Her initial armament was listed as fourteen to sixteen 6-pounder muzzle loading smooth bore guns mounted on trucks and two minion cannons. A minion cannon was a muzzle loading smooth bore 1,000 pound gun with a 31/2 inch bore firing a 4-inch shot with a 4-pound powder charge. The guns were also mounted on wooden trucks, By 1685 this was changed to sixteen sakers and two 3-pounder smooth bore guns. A saker cannon was a muzzle loading smooth bore 1,400 pound gun with a 31/2 inch bore firing a 5 1/2 inch shot with a 5 1/2 pound powder charge. The guns were also mounted on wooden trucks.

Commissioned Service
Her first commission was on 19 June 1675 under the command of Henry Priestman, RN for service in the Mediterranean. Captain William Trelawney, RN took command on 6 February 1678 for service in Home Waters until his death on 21 August 1679. In 1679 she was under the command of Captain Greenville Collins, RN while attending on Trinity House. Captain William Gifford, RN was in command from 22 April 1682 until 22 February 1684 for service at Sale. Captain Thomas Leighton, RN took command on 26 February 1684 until 1686. She was in a boat action at Mamora on 12 June 1684. Captain Thomas Ashton, RN was in command on 22 April 1687 for service in the Channel. on 15 June 1688 Captain John Laton, RN took over command followed by Captain John Grimsditch, RN on 23 July 1688 then Captain William Tollemache, RN on 15 December 1688. She captured the Privateer Vogoreux-Roland on 10 May 1689.

In May 1689 she came under Captain Richard Fitzpatrick, RN for fisheries protection. During 1690-91 she was under Captain Andrew Douglas, RN in the Irish Channel then later back to the English Channel. Captain Peter Wotton, RN took command on 17 July 1692 for service with the Fleet. She moved to the Mediterranean in 1693. She was with the Smyrna convoy in June 1693. She took the privateer L'Experance on 1 May 1694. In 1695 she came under command of Captain Edward Hopson, RN then on 17 June of the same year she came under command of Captain Samuel Whitaker, RN. She was with Shovell's squadron in the Channel. She took the privateer L'Entrepenante on 24 February 1696. She was with Berkeley's Main Fleet in 1696. Her final commander was Captain Charles Strickland, RN at Guernsey on 7 August 1696.

Disposition
Larke was sold on 3 May 1698.

Notes

Citations

References
 Winfield, British Warships in the Age of Sail (1603 – 1714), by Rif Winfield, published by Seaforth Publishing, England © 2009, EPUB , Chapter 6, The Sixth Rates, Vessels acquired from 2 May 1660, 1669 - 75 Construction, Larke
 Colledge, Ships of the Royal Navy, by J.J. Colledge, revised and updated by Lt Cdr Ben Warlow and Steve Bush, published by Seaforth Publishing, Barnsley, Great Britain, © 2020, e  (EPUB), Section L (Larke)

 

1670s ships
Corvettes of the Royal Navy
Naval ships of the United Kingdom